Tisis seclusella is a moth in the family Lecithoceridae. It was described by Francis Walker in 1864. It is found on Borneo.

Adults are ferruginous brown, without markings. The hindwings have a luteous (muddy-yellow) penicillate (with a tuft of fine hairs) streak along the costa.

References

Moths described in 1864
Tisis